David Marshall Grant (born June 21, 1955) is an American actor, singer and writer.

Life and career
Grant was born in Westport, Connecticut to physician parents. Immediately after graduating from Connecticut College with an M.F.A. and receiving a certificate in fine arts from the Yale School of Drama, his first paying job was as Richard Gere's lover in the Broadway play Bent. A student at Juilliard during summer breaks from high school, Grant soon joined the Yale Repertory Company during his college days, and in 1978, made a great impression in the play Bent.

His first screen role was in the 1979 film French Postcards. He went on to appear in several more films. In 1985, he co-starred with Kevin Costner in American Flyers, John Badham's film on bicycle racing. By this time, Grant was working in episodic television and  had the role of Digger Barnes in the miniseries Dallas: The Early Years. In 1987, he played Sonny Binkley in the Matt Dillon film The Big Town. In 1989, he portrayed the gay character Russell Weller on the television show thirtysomething. Although he only appeared in four episodes from 1989 to 1990, the role brought him considerable recognition, particularly in one groundbreaking episode that featured his character in bed with another male character, a scene that caused outcry among conservative sponsors at the time.

Grant played roles in various television shows and movies, including Happy Birthday, Gemini, Legs, Labor of Love, CSI: Miami, Law & Order, Criminal Minds, and Alias. He played a gay husband in the 2004 remake of The Stepford Wives; the father of Anne Hathaway's character in the 2006 film The Devil Wears Prada; and more recently appeared on television in a May 2009 episode of Party Down and in the fifth season premiere of A Million Little Things in February 2023.

On the stage, Grant is most notable for his portrayal of Joe Pitt in the first Broadway production of Tony Kushner's Angels in America. The role earned him a 1994 Tony Award nomination as Best Actor (Featured Role – Play).

In 1998, Grant began a career as a writer. Snakebit, his first play, premiered at Grove Street Playhouse and transferred to the Century Theatre. The play was nominated for the 1999 Drama Desk Award for Outstanding Play and was nominated for an Outer Critics Circle Award. Current Events, his second play, was produced by Manhattan Theatre Club in 2000. Pen opened in 2006 at Playwrights Horizons. Also in 2006, he began working for the drama series Brothers & Sisters as a screenwriter, story editor and (as of season 2 in September 2007), a series producer. The show was co-produced by Ken Olin, whom Grant had worked with on thirtysomething. In 2012, he was a writer and producer on the musical series Smash.

Grant is the great-great-grandson of the first couple to have their wedding featured in the famous wedding announcement section of the New York Times. He is also a distant cousin to Ulysses S. Grant, the 18th president of the United States.

Film and television
French Postcards (1979) as Alex
Happy Birthday, Gemini (1980) as Randy
American Flyers (1985) as David Sommers
Dallas: The Early Years (1986) as Digger Barnes
The Big Town  (1987) as Sonny Binkley
Bat*21 (1988) as Ross Carver
 Breaking Point (1989) as Osterman
thirtysomething (5 episodes between 1989 and 1990) as Russell Weller
Air America (1990) as Rob Diehl
Strictly Business (1991) as David
Citizen Cohn (1992) as Robert Kennedy
Forever Young (1992) as Lt. Col. Wilcox, USAF
Through the Eyes of a Killer (1992) TV as Max Campbell
And the Band Played On (1993) as Dennis Seeley
Chicago Hope episode "Internal Affairs" (March 20, 1995) as Stephen Tomilson
Three Wishes (1995) as Phil
The Chamber (1996) as Governor David McAllister
The Rock as White House Chief of Staff Hayden Sinclair
A Season in Purgatory (1996) miniseries
Law & Order episode "Harvest" (October 29, 1997) and episode "Shadow" (November 26, 1997) as Charlie Harmon
Nothing Sacred (6 episodes in 1998, 3 unaired) as Fr. Martin Briggs
Law & Order: Criminal Intent episode "Best Defense" (October 20, 2002)
The Stepford Wives (2004) as Jerry Harmon
Numb3rs episode "Dirty Bomb" (April 22, 2005) as Brent Hauser
CSI: Miami episode "Murder in a Flash" (2005) as Headmaster Brooks
The Devil Wears Prada (2006) as Richard Sachs

References

External links

1955 births
American male film actors
American male television actors
Living people
People from Westport, Connecticut
Yale School of Drama alumni
American gay writers
American gay actors
American gay musicians
Male actors from Connecticut
Writers from Connecticut
LGBT people from Connecticut
20th-century American male actors
21st-century American male actors
21st-century American dramatists and playwrights
20th-century American dramatists and playwrights
American male dramatists and playwrights
20th-century American male writers
21st-century American male writers
21st-century LGBT people